The 2010–11 Ghanaian Premier League (known as the Glo Premier League for sponsorship reasons) season was the 52nd season of top-tier football in Ghana. The competition began on 5 September 2010, and ended on 5 June 2011.

Team movement

Promoted to 2010–11 Ghanaian Premier League
BA Stars
Tudu Mighty Jets
Ebusua Dwarfs

Relegated to 2010–11 Ghanaian Football Leagues
Great Olympics
Eleven Wise 	
Sekondi Hasaacas

Teams

Name changes
2011: Kessben F.C. were renamed to Medeama SC.

Standings

References

External links
 Season at soccerway.com

Ghana Premier League seasons
Ghana
1